The Clifton Extension Railway was a joint railway in Bristol, owned by the Great Western Railway (GWR) and the Midland Railway (MR) companies.

Description of line
The railway ran from a junction with the GWR at Narroways Hill, just north of Stapleton Road railway station, to Avonmouth Docks.  The branch was joined at Ashley Hill junction, just beyond Narroways Hill, by a line which left the Midland main line at Kingswood Junction, south-west of Fishponds station. 

The first section of line through Montpelier to Clifton Down opened on 1 October 1874. The greatest engineering feature of the branch was a mile-long tunnel underneath Clifton Down. The section through the tunnel from Clifton Down station to Sneyd Park Junction, where it connected to the Bristol Port Railway, opened to goods traffic in 1877 and to passenger trains on 1 September 1885.

Legal history
Originally the railway was promoted by the Bristol Port Railway and Pier Company, incorporated under the Bristol Port Railway and Pier Act of 17 June 1862. In 1871 the railway was transferred to the Great Western and Midland railway companies jointly, under the Great Western and Midland railway companies (Clifton and Bristol) Act of 25 May 1871, and the Midland Railway (Additional Powers) Act of 25 July 1890. The line was administered by the Clifton Extension Railway Joint Committee until 1894, and from then the Great Western and Midland Railways Joint Committee.

Recent history

The line from Narroways Hill is now part of the Severn Beach Line.

The connection to the Midland Railway closed in 1965, and the thirteen arch viaduct over the River Frome valley was demolished in 1968.

References

Rail transport in Bristol
British joint railway companies
Railway lines opened in 1874
1862 establishments in England